Bruff is a Gaelic Athletic Association club based in Bruff, County Limerick, Ireland. The club was founded in 1887 and fields teams in both hurling and Gaelic football.

Overview

Honours

 Limerick Premier Intermediate Hurling Championship: (1) 2014, Runners-Up 2018, 2022
 Munster Club Intermediate Hurling Championship: Runners-Up 2014
 Limerick Intermediate Hurling Championship: (2) 1989, 2008
 Limerick Intermediate Football Championship: Runners-Up 1988
 Limerick Junior Football Championship: Winners 1987, 2008...  Runners-Up 1979
 Munster Club Junior Football Championship: Runners-Up 2008
 Limerick Premier Under-21 Hurling Championship: Winners 1992...   Runners-Up 1985, 1994
 Limerick Premier Under-21 Football Championship: Winners 2008...  Runners-Up 2007, 2010
 Limerick Premier Minor Hurling Championship: Winners 1941, 1983, 2022
 Limerick Premier Minor Football Championship: Winners 1984
 Limerick Premier U16 Hurling Championship: Winners 1966, 1982
 Limerick Premier U16 Football Championship: Winners 1989

Notable players
 Paul Browne
 George Clancy
 Anthony O'Riordan
 Seán Finn
 Kevin Bonnar

See also
 Bruff R.F.C., rugby union club

References

External links
Clubs: South Division Clubs

Gaelic games clubs in County Limerick
Hurling clubs in County Limerick
Gaelic football clubs in County Limerick